Neuropilin (NRP) and tolloid (TLL)-like 1 is a protein that in humans is encoded by the NETO1 gene.

Function 

This gene encodes a predicted transmembrane protein containing two extracellular CUB domains followed by a low-density lipoprotein class A (LDLa) domain. A similar gene in mice encodes a protein that plays a critical role in spatial learning and memory by regulating the function of synaptic N-methyl-D-aspartic acid receptor complexes in the hippocampus. Alternatively spliced transcript variants encoding multiple isoforms have been observed for this gene. [provided by RefSeq, Jan 2011].

References

Further reading